The Optical Society of Japan (OSJ) is professional organization of physicists conducting research in Optics. The organization was founded in 1952 as a division of the Japan Society of Applied Physics (JSAP). It has nearly 2,000 members and is the biggest division of JSAP.

The main journal of the society is Optical Review, and the membership journal is Kogaku.

External links
http://annex.jsap.or.jp/OSJ/Eng/about.html, OSJ page at the JSAP.
http://annex.jsap.or.jp/OSJ, OSJ page at the JSAP, Japanese version

Optics institutions
1952 establishments in Japan
Scientific organizations established in 1952
Scientific societies based in Japan